Melinda Page Hamilton (born August 22, 1974) is an American actress, best known for her role as Odessa Burakov in the Lifetime comedy-drama series Devious Maids, and for her leading role in the independent film Sleeping Dogs Lie (2006). She has had recurring roles on Desperate Housewives, Mad Men, and Big Love.

Life and career
Hamilton was born in New York City. She attended  Princeton University and later the Tisch School of the Arts in New York University. She starred in a number of theatre productions, including as the title character in the original stage production of Cornelia, written by Mark V. Olsen. She made her television debut in the episode of NBC legal drama Law & Order in 1997, and as of 2003 began playing regular guest-star roles in shows like Star Trek: Enterprise, Nip/Tuck, Ghost Whisperer, Criminal Minds, The Closer, Castle, NCIS, Modern Family and True Blood.

Her memorable 2003 Star Trek: Enterprise role of Feezal, the alien scientist and second wife of Doctor Phlox, explored the concept of polygamy.

She had a supporting role in the 2004 film Promised Land, and the lead role in the 2006 film Sleeping Dogs Lie. She also appeared in the films Corporate Affairs (2008), Not Forgotten (2009) and God Bless America (2011).

On television, she had recurring roles in the ABC comedy-drama series Desperate Housewives as Sister Mary Bernard, a nun pursuing a married man; and on the AMC period drama Mad Men, as Anna Draper, polio survivor and widow of the man whose identity Don Draper stole in Korea. She also guest-starred on Grey's Anatomy and its spin-off Private Practice, and on all of the shows in the CSI franchise: CSI: Crime Scene Investigation CSI: NY, and CSI: Miami. She also appeared in HBO drama series Big Love from 2009 to 2010.

In 2013, Hamilton appeared as Odessa Burakov in the first two seasons of the Lifetime comedy-drama series Devious Maids, for which she perfected a Russian accent. In 2015, she had recurring roles in the USA Network series Dig, and the SundanceTV drama, Rectify. 

She had the recurring role of Special Agent Telesco in the ABC Drama series How To Get Away With Murder. She appeared in the Amazon Prime Video series The Peripheral.

Filmography

Film

Television

References

External links

1974 births
Living people
20th-century American actresses
21st-century American actresses
Actresses from New York City
American film actresses
American stage actresses
American television actresses
Princeton University alumni
Tisch School of the Arts alumni